Athletics was one of the sports at the biennial Central Asian Games. Athletics competitions were held at every edition of the games since 1995 and it is one of the core sports of the games.

Editions

Champions

Men's 100 metres
1995: 
1997: 
1999: 
2003:

Men's 200 metres
1995: 
1997: 
1999: 
2003:

Men's 400 metres
1995: 
1997: 
1999: 
2003:

Men's 800 metres
1995: 
1997: 
1999: 
2003:

Men's 1500 metres
1995: 
1997: 
1999: Not held
2003:

Men's 5000 metres
1995: 
1997: 
1999: 
2003:

Men's 10,000 metres
1995: Not held
1997: 
1999: 
2003:

Men's 3000 m steeplechase
1995: 
1997: 
1999: 
2003:

Men's 110 m hurdles
1995: 
1997: 
1999: 
2003:

Men's 400 m hurdles
1995: 
1997: 
1999: 
2003:

Men's high jump
1995: 
1997: 
1999: 
2003:

Men's pole vault
1995: Not held
1997: 
1999: 
2003: Not held

Men's long jump
1995: 
1997: 
1999: 
2003:

Men's triple jump
1995: 
1997: 
1999: 
2003:

Men's shot put
1995: 
1997: 
1999: 
2003:

Men's discus throw
1995: 
1997: 
1999: 
2003:

Men's hammer throw
1995: 
1997: 
1999: 
2003:

Men's javelin throw
1995: 
1997: 
1999: 
2003:

Men's decathlon
1995: 
1997: 
1999: 
2003: Not held

Men's 20 km walk
1995: Not held
1997: 
1999: 
2003:

Men's 4 × 100 metres relay
1995: 
1997: 
1999: 
2003:

Men's 4 × 400 metres relay
1995: 
1997: 
1999: 
2003:

Women's 100 metres
1995: 
1997: 
1999: 
2003:

Women's 200 metres
1995: 
1997: 
1999: 
2003:

Women's 400 metres
1995: 
1997: 
1999: 
2003:

Women's 800 metres
1995: 
1997: 
1999: 
2003:

Women's 1500 metres
1995: 
1997: 
1999: 
2003:

Women's 5000 metres
1995: 
1997: 
1999: 
2003:

Women's 10,000 metres
1995: Not held
1997: Not held
1999: 
2003:

Women's 100 m hurdles
1995: 
1997: 
1999: 
2003:

Women's 400 m hurdles
1995: 
1997: 
1999: 
2003:

Women's high jump
1995: 
1997: 
1999: 
2003:

Women's long jump
1995: 
1997: 
1999: 
2003:

Women's triple jump
1995: 
1997: 
1999: 
2003:

Women's shot put
1995: 
1997: 
1999: 
2003:

Women's discus throw
1995: 
1997: 
1999: 
2003:

Women's hammer throw
1995: Not held
1997: Not held
1999: Not held
2003:

Women's javelin throw
1995: 
1997: 
1999: 
2003:

Women's heptathlon
1995: 
1997: 
1999: 
2003:

Women's 10 km walk
1995: Not held
1997: 
1999: 
2003: Not held

Women's 4 × 100 metres relay
1995: 
1997: 
1999: 
2003:

Women's 4 × 400 metres relay
1995: 
1997: 
1999: 
2003:

References

Champions
Central Asian Games. GBR Athletics. Retrieved 2020-02-15.

 
Central Asian Games
Athletics
Central Asian Games